Chucho Avellanet, nicknamed "Chucho", is a Puerto Rican singer and comedic actor of Spanish-Català descent.

External links 
 Online Discography

See also
 List of Puerto Ricans

Living people
20th-century Puerto Rican male singers
Puerto Rican comedians
Puerto Rican people of Spanish descent
Puerto Rican people of Catalan descent
Puerto Rican people of Italian descent
Year of birth missing (living people)